Tasmannia purpurascens, commonly known as the broad-leaved pepperbush or purple pepperbush is a shrub in the primitive family Winteraceae and is only found growing in the Barrington Tops and Ben Halls Gap regions of New South Wales. It is locally abundant in a restricted subalpine habitat with a high rainfall, often growing in the ecotone in association with Antarctic Beech.

Description 
They are glabrous with a purplish base, lack a distinct petiole and have a raised midrib on the lower surface. The flowers are either male or female but occur on the same plant.

Taxonomy and naming
The broad-leaved pepperbush was first formally described in 1937 by Joyce Vickery who gave it the name Drimys purpurascens and published the description in Proceedings of the Linnean Society of New South Wales. In 1969, Albert Smith transferred the species to Tasmannia based on its chromosome number of 13, compared to 43 in most others in Drimys.<ref name="Smith">{{cite journal|last1=Smith|first1=Albert C.|title=A reconsideration of the genus Tasmannia (Winteraceae)|journal=Taxon|date=1969|volume=18|issue=3|pages=286–290|doi=10.2307/1218830|jstor=1218830}}</ref> The specific epithet (purpurascens) is derived from the Latin word purpureus meaning "purple" with the suffix -escens meaning "becoming" referring to the reddish-purple base of the midvein.

The genus Tasmannia is of interest to scientists as these plants are some of the most primitive of all angiosperms. They have a primitive flowering structure and the wood is similar to that of conifers, in that it lacks vessels.

In common with other members of the genus, it is sometimes known as "pepperbush" because of the spicy fruits and seeds which have been used to flavour food.

It is abundant in the Ben Halls Gap and Barrington Tops National Parks, growing where it sometimes snows and where frosts are common in winter.

ConservationTasmannia purpurascens was previously listed as "Vulnerable" under the Environment Protection and Biodiversity Conservation Act 1999'' but was delisted in 2013. It remains listed as "vulnerable" in New South Wales.

Use in horticulture 
This plant is difficult to propagate from seed but readily propagated from cuttings taken in early autumn. Its slow growth, attractive appearance and resistance to pests make it useful as an indoor plant.

References 

purpurascens
Magnoliids of Australia
Flora of New South Wales
Vulnerable flora of Australia
Garden plants
Plants described in 1937